The West London League was an association football competition featuring teams located in and around West London. It was formed in 1892, and featured only amateur teams.

History
The league was formed in 1892, with its original members being Fulham, Queen's Park Rangers, Stanley, Paddington, Southall, Grove House, Kildare, and St. John's College.

Champions

1892-93 - Fulham
1895-96 - Stanley FC
1900-1901 - Staines Town
1931-1932- Lighthouse football Club

References

Football competitions in London
Defunct football leagues in England